Kristin Armstrong Municipal Park is a  urban park in the western United States, along the Boise River in Boise, Idaho. The park is managed by the Boise Parks and Recreation Department and includes picnic facilities, bocce courts, and a playground.

History
The park was constructed  in 1918 by the Boise Commercial Club on land leased from the Boise School District. It operated under the name, Boise Tourist Campground, and it featured overnight camping facilities. The campground was closed briefly in 1938, but the property reopened as a day use urban park under the name, Boise Municipal Park.

Airway Park, later "Braves Field," was the city's minor league baseball park from 1939 through 1963. The land was formerly the southwest portion of Municipal Park; the wooden venue was razed and the site became the headquarters of the Idaho Department of Fish and Game.

In 2016, the park was rededicated in honor of three-time Olympic gold medalist Kristin Armstrong.

See also
 
 List of parks in Boise

References

External links

Park map

Parks in Idaho
Boise, Idaho
1918 establishments in Idaho
Protected areas established in 1918